Siw Wittgren-Ahl (born 1951) is a Swedish social democratic politician. She has been a member of the Riksdag since 1995.

External links
Siw Wittgren-Ahl at the Riksdag website

1951 births
Living people
Members of the Riksdag from the Social Democrats
Women members of the Riksdag
Members of the Riksdag 2002–2006
21st-century Swedish women politicians
Members of the Riksdag 1994–1998
Members of the Riksdag 1998–2002
Members of the Riksdag 2006–2010
20th-century Swedish women politicians